Noah Mbamba-Muanda, known as Noah Mbamba (born 5 January 2005) is a Belgian professional footballer who plays as a defender for Bundesliga club Bayer Leverkusen.

Club career
On 22 January 2021, Mbamba made his debut for Brugge's reserve side, Club NXT in the Belgian First Division B against Lierse.

He made his league debut for the senior squad of Brugge in the Belgian First Division A on 23 May 2021, when he started in the game against Genk, at the age of 16.
He made his Champions league debut on 3 November 2021 against Manchester City at the age of 16.

On 14 January 2023, Mbamba joined German club Bayer Leverkusen for an undisclosed fee, signing a contract until June 2028.

International career
Born in Belgium, Mbamba is of Congolese descent. He is a youth international for Belgium.

Career statistics

Club

Honours
Club Brugge
 Belgian Super Cup: 2021

References

External links

Profile at the Club Brugge website

2005 births
Living people
Footballers from Brussels
People from Ixelles
Belgian footballers
Belgium youth international footballers
Belgian people of Democratic Republic of the Congo descent
Association football defenders
Club NXT players
Club Brugge KV players
Challenger Pro League players
Belgian Pro League players